Bankura Zilla School is one of the oldest and Best  schools of Bankura District, West Bengal. Established in 1840 this school is popularly known as Zilla School. The main language of instruction used is Bengali.

History
Bankura Zilla School was established by Dr. G. N. Cheek, a civil surgeon and indigo planter, and Mr. Francis Goldsberry, the Bankura District Sessions Judge as the first English school of the district, Bankura Free School in the year 1840, which later renamed to Bankura Zilla School. The school started in 'Sepoy Barrack Hospital' building which was established in the year 1809. Nowadays this building is termed as 'hall' in the school.

It is converted to Zilla School in the year 1846 and renamed to zilla school. After being converted into govt school, eastern and western part of the main building were extended. The office room of the existing school was made with the financial assistance of Maharaja Mahatabchand Bahadur of Burdwan in 1851.

Affiliation
This school is affiliated to West Bengal Board of Secondary Education and West Bengal Council of Higher Secondary Education

Academics
Bankura Zilla School has been consistently producing several top performers in West Bengal Madhyamik examination as well as Higher Secondary Exam.  For Example in 2017, six students from Bankura Zilla School were in top 10 in the state.

See also
Purulia Zilla School
Bishnupur High School (Bankura)

References

High schools and secondary schools in West Bengal
Schools in Bankura district
Educational institutions established in 1840
1840 establishments in British India